The Kitchener Rangers are a major junior ice hockey team based in Kitchener, Ontario, Canada. They are members of the Midwest Division of the Western Conference of the Ontario Hockey League. The Rangers have won the J. Ross Robertson Cup as OHL champions in 1981, 1982, 2003 and 2008. They have appeared in six Memorial Cups (1981, 1982, 1984, 1990, 2003 and 2008), advancing to the final game of the tournament each of those six years. They are two-time Memorial Cup champions (1982, 2003).

The Rangers are one of six teams in the Canadian Hockey League (Moose Jaw Warriors, Swift Current Broncos, Lethbridge Hurricanes, Peterborough Petes) that are publicly owned. Since the club's inception, a 39-person Board of Directors, including a nine-person executive committee, is elected by the team's season ticket subscribers who act as trustees of the team. This Board of Directors is also comprised entirely and only of Kitchener Rangers season ticket subscribers.

They are one of the most successful Canadian Hockey League teams in terms of alumni with over 180 players and coaches going on to serve in the NHL including Gabriel Landeskog, Jeff Skinner, Radek Faksa, John Gibson, Nazem Kadri, Mike Richards, David Clarkson, Steve Mason, Derek Roy and Peter DeBoer. Five of their alumni have gone on to be inducted into the Hockey Hall of Fame: Scott Stevens, Bill Barber, Paul Coffey, Larry Robinson and Al MacInnis.

History
The Kitchener Rangers franchise was inaugurated ahead of the 1947–48 Ontario Hockey Association season as the Guelph Biltmore Mad Hatters. Based in nearby Guelph, Ontario, the Biltmore Mad Hatters were a farm team for the National Hockey League's New York Rangers. The team enjoyed considerable success in the 1950s, winning three league championships and a Memorial Cup. However, by 1960, the team was struggling financially and was sold to new ownership. The new owners re-branded the team as the Guelph Royals to match Guelph's nickname, the "Royal City". Despite these efforts to reignite the fading brand, the team's financial struggles persisted. At the end of the 1962–63 season, Kitchener entrepreneur Eugene George was approached by the New York Rangers about moving the team to Kitchener in hopes of building a more stable junior environment.

In 1963, George and a group of Kitchener businessmen relocated the Guelph Royals to Kitchener and renamed them the Kitchener Rangers Junior "A" Hockey Club. The New York Rangers sponsorship of the team ended in 1967 with the expansion of the NHL's "Original Six’" Era, so George agreed to purchase the team from the New York Rangers for a sum of one dollar, but declined the opportunity for private ownership. He instead turned the team over to the community through the creation of a not-for-profit organization. The Kitchener Rangers Charter declared "no person shall be a member of the Corporation unless he is a season ticket subscriber for the current season of the home hockey games of the club, and all persons who are season ticket subscribers are automatically entitled to membership."

The 1960s
For their debut season in 1963–64 the team moved into the Kitchener Memorial Auditorium, which had previously been home to the Kitchener Greenshirts and the Kitchener Canucks. On Tuesday, October 1, 1963, the Rangers' first coach, Steve Brklacich, welcomed a 54-player roster of training camp hopefuls just two weeks prior to the home opener. The first exhibition game took place on Sunday, October 6, 1963 against the Peterborough Petes. The team's first regular season game featured the Rangers and the visiting St. Catharines Black Hawks on Tuesday, October 15, 1963 which dressed the likes of league All-Stars Dennis Hull and Doug Jarrett. The first goal in team history was scored by John Beechey, assisted by Gary Sabourin and Tommy Miller, at 11:36 of the first period. The team's first captain, Alexander 'Sandy' Fitzpatrick, would score the first game-winning goal in team history, breaking open a 3–3 tie in the third period to propel the Blueshirts to a 4–3 win. The Rangers were successful promoting the team in the community, drawing high attendance despite a poor first season in the standings which finished with a record of 9-41-6 (W-L-T).

The Rangers struggled during their first three seasons in the OHA, finishing under .500 in the following two campaigns (6th in 1964–65, 7th in 1965–66). Despite the seventh-place finish in 1965–66, the team finished the year strong and won the first two rounds of playoffs to make it to the OHA Finals, eventually falling 4–1 in a best-of-seven series to the Oshawa Generals and a young Bobby Orr. Kitchener finished in first place the next season (1966–67, 38-10-6), earning their first Hamilton Spectator Trophy in franchise history as regular season champions, but fell to the Toronto Marlboros in the semi-finals. In 1967–68, the Rangers were first again in the OHA and went on to win their second consecutive Hamilton Spectator Trophy. They played in the Finals again, but this time losing a close series 4 games to 3 with a tie, to the eventual Memorial Cup champion Niagara Falls Flyers. In 1968–69, Jim Malleck succeeded Eugene George as the team's president. In November 1968, Kitchener native Dave Weber was appointed coach after Wally Kullman was relieved of his duties. But the Rangers posted just nine wins (9-40-5), finishing in 10th place after seeing 13 players from the previous season graduate to the professional ranks. In 1969, Walter (Punch) Scherer, a former scout for the Boston Bruins, became the team's general manager. The decade finished on a high note, however, as rookie Bill Barber dressed in his first of three junior seasons in Kitchener and tallied 37 goals and 86 points in just 54 regular season games.

1969 also marked the year that Les Bradley joined the team. Bradley was a mainstay on the bench as the team's trainer from 1969 to 1986, then after retiring as a trainer became an ambassador in the press room for more than 15 years.

The 1970s
Gerry Forler became the Rangers' coach for the 1970–71 season but resigned in December, 1970 and was replaced by Ron Murphy for the remainder of the season. Kitchener struggled through most of the decade, posting only two winning seasons (a 31-24-8 record in 1971–72, and 43-18-9 in 1973–74). Barber posted his first of two straight 100+ point seasons in 1970–71, scoring 46 goals and 105 points in 61 regular season games. He was one of two players to hit the 100-point milestone (Tom Cassidy, 104 points) that year, but the Rangers were unable to get out of the first round of the playoffs. In 1973–74, the Rangers finished first in the OHA for their third Hamilton Spectator Trophy in eight years in large part due to the goalkeeping of Don Edwards, who had the league's lowest goals against average. The team lost to the Peterborough Petes in the second round of the playoffs.

In the 1974–75 season, the club finished last in the league and 20 points out of a playoff spot with a record of 17-47-6. Despite their last-place finish, the Rangers would host the Memorial Cup that season as no host team was in place. For the following season in 1975–76, there were changes at president, general manager and coach. The team improved by 17 points, rising to a fourth-place finish in the standings. In 1976–77, Foster would set the Rangers franchise record for points in a single season (143), a mark that still stands today. His total 382 points in 262 regular season games over 1973-77 also remains a club record.

The Rangers' record during the 1979–80 season dropped to 17-51-0, but Paul Coffey, a young acquired defenceman from the Sault Ste. Marie Greyhounds, collected 71 points in 52 regular season games before being drafted sixth overall by the Edmonton Oilers in the 1980 NHL Entry Draft.

The 1980s

1981 Memorial Cup 
The Rangers were looking to rebound from a 17-51-0 season in 1979–80, but the first half of the 1980-81 campaign left them in last place at Christmas. But a strong second half - culminating with eight wins in nine games to finish the season - propelled the Rangers to a first-place finish and an Emms Division title. They would see a 35-point improvement from the previous season, finishing with a mark of 34-33-1. Coached by Orval Tessier, the Rangers were led offensively by 49 goals and 116 points from right winger Brian Bellows, along with 54 goals and 108 points from left winger Jeff Larmer. Centreman Grant Martin was just two points shy of joining them in the century club, notching 41 goals and 98 points. Other standouts on the squad included Al MacInnis, Mike Eagles, Larry Carroll and goalie Wendell Young.

Kitchener's playoffs began against the Niagara Falls Flyers, and they defeated them with a 4–2 series win, including one tie. The Rangers scored five or more goals in every game of the series, with the exception of the 3–3 tie in Game 4. Next up was a meeting with the Windsor Spitfires in Round 3, which the Rangers won 4–0 with one tie. Again the Blueshirts offense proved formidable, scoring no fewer than four goals in each contest and twice scoring seven. This set the stage for an OHL Final vs. the Sault Ste. Marie Greyhounds. The Hounds were favoured to win the league title, having averaged the highest goals per game average in the league and finishing 27 points ahead of Kitchener in the regular season standings. The Rangers, however, held the Greyhounds to 16 goals in the series six games and were undefeated in the league final. They skated to a 3–0 series win with three ties to earn their first J. Ross Robertson Cup as OHL champions in franchise history.

The 1981 Memorial Cup was played at the Windsor Arena in Windsor, Ontario. Kitchener represented the Ontario Hockey League while centre Barry Pederson (65 goals, 147 points in 55 regular season games), right winger Rich Chernomaz (49 goals, 113 points in 72 games) and goaltender Grant Fuhr were key pieces of the Western Hockey League's Victoria Cougars. The Quebec Major Junior Hockey League squad - and defending Memorial Cup Champions - were the Cornwall Royals which featured the likes of centre Dale Hawerchuk (81 goals, 183 points in 72 games), left winger Marc Crawford (42 goals, 99 points in 63 games) and centre Doug Gilmour (35 points in 51 games).

Kitchener lost its first two games; 6–3 to Cornwall and 7–4 to Victoria. The Rangers then posted consecutive victories; 6–4 over the Royals in which Bellows scored a hat trick, and 4-2 vs. the Cougars. The Rangers went on to face Cornwall in the tournament final but dropped a 5-2 decision to the Royals, who would win their second consecutive Memorial Cup.

1982 Memorial Cup
Joe Crozier took over the coaching duties after the 1980–81 season after coach/general manager Orval Tessier left the team to become head coach of the American Hockey League's New Brunswick Hawks, who he would lead to a Calder Cup championship. Kitchener picked up where it left off from the previous season, finding success while being led by top players Larry Carroll, Brian Bellows and Jeff Larmer, as well as added future NHL players Scott Stevens and Mike Hough. The Rangers won the Emms Division for the second year in a row with a much improved record (44-21-3).

Kitchener earned a first round bye in the playoffs, then skated to a 4–0 series win over the Windsor Spitfires in Round 2. They once again clashed with the Sault Ste. Marie Greyhounds, this time in Round 3, and again earned a series win this time in five games (4-1). The Rangers faced off against the Ottawa 67's, coached by Brian Kilrea, in the league final and claimed their second straight J. Ross Robertson Cup with a 4–0 series victory, including one tie.

The 1982 Memorial Cup was played at Robert Guertin Arena in Hull, Quebec. Kitchener represented the Ontario Hockey League, while left winger Gerard Gallant (34 goals, 92 points in 58 regular season games) and centre John Chabot (34 goals, 143 points in 62 games) were members of the QMJHL's Sherbrooke Castors. Centre Ken Yaremchuk (58 goals, 157 points in 72 games) and right winger Brian Shaw (56 goals, 132 points in 69 games) were members of the Western Hockey League champion Portland Winter Hawks.

Kitchener lost 10-4 to Sherbrooke in their opener before rebounding with a 9–2 win over Portland in game two. Brian Bellows scored 11 seconds into the game against Portland, setting a Memorial Cup record. In their third game, the Rangers shut out the Castors 4–0. The game was very physical, and included a bench-clearing brawl in the second period. Kitchener seemed to be a bit worn out the next night, losing 4–2 to Portland.

The Rangers and the Castors made it to the finals on a better goals for and against total, after all three teams won and lost two games each in the round-robin. The final game drew 4,091 spectators who saw Bellows score a hat trick and add two assists, propelling the Rangers to a 7–4 victory and their first Memorial Cup championship.

In 1982–83, the Rangers finished with a 45-23-2 record and a second-place finish in the Emms Division. After a first round bye they faced the North Bay Centennials in Round 2 and won the series, 4–1. They would meet the Sault Ste. Marie Greyhounds for the third consecutive year in the playoffs but this time the Hounds won the series, 4–2 with one tie, eliminating the Blueshirts from post-season play.

1984 Memorial Cup
Even before the season began the Rangers knew they would be returning to the Memorial Cup for the third time in four seasons, as they were awarded the right to host the event in 1984. Tom Barrett took over coaching duties prior to the campaign, which saw Kitchener post the best record in the OHL (52-16-2) with 106 points. The Rangers were led offensively by right winger Wayne Presley (63 goals, 139 points in 70 regular season games) and centre John Tucker (40 goals, 100 points in 39 games). Tucker would go on to be named the OHL's Most Outstanding Player, while Presley was the top scoring right winger. Shawn Burr (41 goals, 85 points in 68 games) was the league's Rookie of the Year.

At the end of the regular season, Kitchener earned its third straight first round bye before sweeping the London Knights, 4–0, in the second round. The Rangers avenged the previous season's loss to Sault Ste. Marie by winning that series, 4–3. Kitchener then faced the Ottawa 67's in a rematch of the 1982 OHL Finals, but this time the 67's won the series, 3–0, with two ties.

Kitchener represented the host team in the tournament, while the 67's - including right winger Don McLaren (53 goals, 113 points in 70 games), left winger Gary Roberts (27 goals, 57 points in 48 games) and goaltender Darren Pang - represented the Ontario Hockey League as champions. The Western Hockey League was represented by centre Dean Evason (49 goals, 137 points in 57 games), defenceman Doug Bodger (21 goals, 98 points in 70 games) and the Kamloops Junior Oilers, while the Quebec Major Junior Hockey League champion Laval Voisins featured a 17-year-old Mario Lemieux who tallied 133 goals and 282 points in 70 regular-season games that year.

Kitchener defeated Laval 8–2 in game one, holding Lemieux scoreless. In game two, Kitchener had an 8–0 lead over Kamloops but narrowly held on to win the game 9–7. Ottawa had also won its first two games. The Rangers faced the 67's in the final game of round-robin play, posting a 7–2 victory to earn a berth in the finals. Ottawa won their semi-final, 7–2, for the right to play Kitchener for the championship where they would also hand the Rangers a 7–2 defeat to win the Memorial Cup.

Following the 1984 Memorial Cup, the Rangers would finish sixth (1984–85), third (1985–86), fourth (1986–87) and sixth (1987–88) in their division before reclaiming top spot in the Emms with a 41-19-6 record in 1988–89. Goaltender Gus Morschauser was named the OHL Goaltender of the Year, but the Rangers were upset in the first round of the playoffs by the North Bay Centennials.

The 1990s

1990 Memorial Cup
In 1989–90, the Rangers finished second overall in the Emms Division (38-21-7) but used their experience to prevail through the playoffs. Kitchener earned a 4–1 series win over the North Bay Centennials before earning a second-round bye. They defeated the Niagara Falls Thunder in the third round, 4–1, setting up a final vs. an Oshawa Generals team which featured Eric Lindros (17 goals, 36 points in 25 games). The Rangers took a 3–1 series lead before the Generals won three straight games en route to the J. Ross Robertson Cup as OHL champions.

The 1990 Memorial Cup was played at Copps Coliseum in Hamilton, Ontario. The Dukes of Hamilton were slated to host the tournament, but due to af poor start to their season they finished last place in the league (11-49-6). They were removed from participation, and the Rangers, as league finalists, took their place.

The other two opponents Kitchener would face in the Memorial Cup were the same opponents they faced the last time they played in the tournament; the QMJHL's Laval Titan (formerly Voisins) and the WHL's Kamloops Blazers (formerly Junior Oilers). Kitchener won their opener vs. Kamloops, 8–7 in overtime. They followed that up with a 5–3 win over Laval. Similar to 1984, both Ontario-based team were undefeated after two games and faced each other in the last game of the round-robin. The game was played in front of 11,134 fans, lasting 4 hours 15 minutes into double overtime, with Oshawa winning 5–4. Kitchener then played Laval in the semi-finals, claiming a 5–4 victory.

The Rangers played the Generals in the tournament final with 17,383 fans in attendance. Much like the first game between the two teams, the championship went into double overtime with the Generals emerging as victors, 4–3.

Following the 1990 Memorial Cup run, the remainder of the decade was lackluster for Kitchener. The team managed three winning seasons (32-30-4 in 1992–93, and 35-28-3 in 1995–96) with their best season coming in 1996–97 with a Central Division title and a record of 34-22-10.

The Rangers earned a first-round bye during the playoffs that year, and claimed a 7–3 win over the Sarnia Sting in Game 7 of Round 2. They fell behind, 3–1, in their third round series vs. the Oshawa Generals before winning Game 5, 5–4. But after games in three straight days and five games in their last six, the two teams had a three-day break before resuming their series. After the break, the Raiders lost 6–1 in Game 6, dropping the series, 4–2.

The final two campaigns of the decade would see the team finish beneath .500, where they would remain until the early 2000s.

The 2000s
After missing the playoffs for the second time in three years (1998–99 and 2000–01), the team fired general manager Jamie McDonald, who earlier released Jess Snyder of his duties as head coach. Prior to the start of the 2001–02 season, Peter DeBoer was named the team's new head coach. He would lead them to a 35-22-10-1 record and a third-place finish in the Midwest Division, culminating in a first round playoff matchup with division rival, the Guelph Storm. The Storm would sweep the season series, 4–0.

In 2002-03 the Rangers brought in Steve Spott, a former assistant to Peter DeBoer in their days with the Plymouth Whalers, into the fold. The team, which featured the likes of Mike Richards, Derek Roy, Gregory Campbell and David Clarkson, began the season three losses and a tie in their first four games. After reaching mid-October with a record of 3-3-2-1 the team's record improved, winning eight in a row (11-3-2-1). During November and December they lost just five games, and sported a 26-8-3-1 record as the calendar year changed to 2003. It wasn't until January 12 when they lost their tenth game of the season, and they rebounded with their 30th win of the campaign the following game on January 17. They only lost back-to-back games once from January on; the final two games of the regular season.

The Rangers finished the campaign with a record of 46-14-5-3 (W-L-T-OTL), winning the Midwest Division; those 46 wins setting a new franchise best. Their division title set up a first-round playoff matchup with the Sault Ste. Marie Greyhounds, who the Rangers beat in four straight games. The Greyhounds managed just three goals in the series, being shut out twice by goaltender Scott Dickie in Games 1 and 2. The Rangers faced the Guelph Storm in Round 2, dropping their Highway 7 rivals in five games. Round 3 saw them face the Plymouth Whalers. After skating to a 2–2 series tie through the first four games, the Whalers claimed a 2–1 overtime win at The Aud to take a 3–2 lead. The Rangers earned a 7–4 win in Game 6 to stay alive, then skated to a berth in the OHL Final with a 3–1 win in Game 7.

In the league championship they would take on the eastern conference champion Ottawa 67's. The 67's picked up a 3–2 overtime win in Game 1, but from thereon out it was all Kitchener as the Rangers won the next four games to be crowned J. Ross Robertson Cup champions for the third time in their history. Of the five-game series, three games went to overtime including the series clinching game which was decided in double OT. Derek Roy was named the MVP of the playoffs.

2003 Memorial Cup
The 2003 Memorial Cup was played at Colisée Pepsi in Quebec City, Quebec. Kitchener represented the champions of the Ontario Hockey League, while defencemen Josh Georges, Duncan Keith and Shea Weber were members of the Western Hockey League champion Kelowna Rockets. The Hull Olympiques - featuring forwards Max Talbot and Jean-Michel Daoust - were the Quebec Major Junior Hockey League champions while the host Quebec Remparts were led by forwards David Masse and Josh Hennessy.

Kitchener went through the round-robin undefeated, beating the Remparts 4–3 in their opener, the Olympiques, 4–1 in their second game, and the Rockets, 4–2. In the championship final, the Rangers jumped out to a 1–0 lead on a goal by Andre Benoit just 1:45 into the game, and were up 2-0 after a Gregory Campbell power play goal at 3:32. Evan McGrath's first of two second period goals made it 3-0 Kitchener, as the Rangers and Olympiques each tallied three goals a piece in the middle frame. With the Rangers holding a 5–3 lead through 40 minutes of play, David Clarkson added another with 2:38 to play to secure the club's second Memorial Cup title, defeating Hull, 6–3.

The following season the Rangers finished with a modest record of 34-26-6-2 as they competed with division rivals, the London Knights and Guelph Storm, who each finished the campaign with more than 100 points. Their first round playoff match-up was against the Plymouth Whalers, but besides eking out a 5–4 win in Game 3, the Rangers were handily defeated in the series, 4–1.

In 2004–05, the Rangers once again finished the regular season third in the Midwest Division (35-20-9-4), but their run in the playoffs was much longer  than the prior year's. After defeating the Erie Otters in six games, Kitchener went on to sweep the Owen Sound Attack in Round 2. Their third round match-up was vs. the London Knights, but after skating through a 1–1 series tie after the first two games, the Knights won the next three and eliminated the Rangers in five games.

Despite registering a franchise-best 47 wins the following year in 2005-06 (47–19–1–1) (W–L–OTL–SOL), the Blueshirts and their 96-point campaign was second-best to the London Knights (49 wins, 102 points) in the Midwest Division standings. But after such a successful regular season, in the first round of the playoffs the Owen Sound Attack (who finished 25 points behind Kitchener in the regular season), dropped the Rangers in five games in the opening round.

The 2006–07 saw the team once again turning out another 47-win campaign (47–17–1–3, 98 points), but they again finished second in the Midwest Division to the London Knights (50–14–1–3, 104 points). The Rangers barreled out of the first round, sweeping the Sarnia Sting, 4–0, but were halted by the Plymouth Whalers, 4–1, in Round 2.

In May 2007, it was announced that the Rangers would host the 2008 Memorial Cup, giving the team an automatic entry into the tournament. The 2007-08 team finished with a regular season record of 53-11-1-3, which remains a franchise best in wins and points to this day. They were crowned the winners of the Hamilton Spectator Trophy as the team with the most points (110) in the OHL through the regular season.

In the opening round of the playoffs the Rangers downed the Plymouth Whalers in four straight games, outscoring their opponents, 29–13. In Round 2 it was another sweep for the Blueshirts, this time against the Sarnia Sting. The Rangers surrendered just six goals in those four games, outscoring Sarnia, 18–4. In the third round they met the Sault Ste. Marie Greyhounds, but again skated to victory, this time with a 4–1 series win. The Ontario Hockey League final pitted the Rangers against the eastern conference champion Belleville Bulls. A 3-0 Rangers series lead evaporated into a 3–3 tie, but the Rangers earned their fourth Ontario Hockey League championship with a 4–1 win over the Bulls in the finale.

2008 Memorial Cup
The 2008 Memorial Cup was played at the Kitchener Memorial Auditorium in Kitchener, Ontario. Kitchener represented both the champions of the Ontario Hockey League and the host team. As league finalists, the Belleville Bulls (featuring Matt Beleskey; 41 goals, 90 points in 62 regular season games and PK Subban; eight goals, 46 points in 58 games) also earned a berth in the tournament as representatives of the OHL. Jared Spurgeon, Tyler Johnson, Jared Cowen and Dustin Tokarski were members of the Western Hockey League champion Spokane Chiefs. The Gatineau Olympiques - featuring forwards Claude Giroux, Matthew Pistilli and Paul Byron - were the Quebec Major Junior Hockey League champions.

Kitchener won its first game of the tournament, 6–5 in overtime, vs. Gatineau, before dropping a 2-1 decision to Spokane in the second game of the round robin. Their third game was a 4–3 overtime loss to Belleville, which set up a semi-final meeting between the two teams two nights later in which the Rangers won, 9–0. During the Kitchener-Spokane final, though, the Chiefs skated to a 4–1 win and a Memorial Cup championship on the Rangers home ice at The Aud. During the trophy presentation, the Chiefs endured an infamous gaffe which saw the Memorial Cup come apart and break while the team was passing it among themselves during their celebration.

Following the Memorial Cup run of 2007–08, head coach Peter DeBoer was hired as head coach of the NHL's Florida Panthers and assistant Steve Spott was named the new head coach of the club. After seven straight winning seasons, the team took a step back in the 2008-09 campaign after losing many graduating players from their championship squad. They finished under .500 and fifth in the Midwest Division with a 26-37-3-2 record, missing the playoffs for the first time since 2000–01.

It didn't take long to turn things around with Spott at the helm, as the team rebounded with a 34-point improvement the following season, finishing with a record of 42-19-4-3. After a 4–2 series win over the Saginaw Spirit and an 8–3, Game 7 win over the favoured London Knights in Round 2, the Rangers were bounced from the playoffs in the third round by the Windsor Spitfires in Game 7 after holding a 3–0 series lead. The Spitfires would go on to win their first of back-to-back Memorial Cups.

Ben Fanelli incident
On October 30, 2009, 16-year-old rookie defenceman Ben Fanelli was hit from behind by 20-year-old overage forward Michael Liambis of the Erie Otters at a high speed behind the Rangers' net. The hit, which came at the 7:52 mark of the second period, occurred with such force that it caused Fanelli's helmet to fly off before his head struck a glass partition at the Zamboni entrance. He would suffer a fractured skull and orbital bone and was immediately airlifted to Hamilton General Hospital where he was placed in intensive care. Fanelli was released from Hamilton General Hospital a week later on November 6, 2009. Liambas was suspended for the remainder of the season and the playoffs. After an absence of nearly two years, Fanelli returned to the Rangers and later became team captain. He was named the recipient of the Dan Snyder Memorial Trophy as the OHL Humanitarian of the Year, and also named the CHL Humanitarian of the Year.

The 2010s

The 2009–10 season was highlighted by a 50-goal campaign by Jeff Skinner, followed by a 47-goal effort by Jeremy Morin. The team would finish the regular season third in the western conference with a record of 42-19-4-3 for 91 points. After defeating the Saginaw Spirit in six games in Round 1, and the London Knights in Game 7 of Round 2, the Rangers took a 3–0 series lead over the Windsor Spitfires in the Western Conference Final but surrendered four straight games to the eventual Memorial Cup champion Spits, who never lost another game after Game 3 vs. the Rangers en route to the CHL championship.

The Rangers once again finished third in the conference in 2010–11, and were led by overage Jason Akeson (24G - 84A = 108 points). Down 3–1 in their best-of-seven opening round playoff series vs. the Plymouth Whalers, the Rangers battled back to force a Game 7 but fell short in the deciding game, 4–2. Akeson earned a slew of awards at season's end, including the Eddie Powers Memorial Trophy as the OHL Top Scorer, Jim Mahon Memorial Trophy as the OHL Top Scoring Right Winger, the William Hanley Trophy as OHL Most Sportsmanlike Player, and the Leo Lalonde Memorial Trophy as OHL Top Overage Player.

In 2011–12, Tobias Rieder breached the 40-goal mark, potting 42 goals and 85 points to lead the team offensively. The team returned to the Western Conference Final after a 4–1 series win in Round 1 vs. the Owen Sound Attack, a 4–3 series win vs. the Plymouth Whalers in Round 2, but were swept in Round 3 by the London Knights. Chief Operating Officer and Governor, Steve Bienkowski, was named the CHL's Executive of the Year.

The team slipped to fourth in the western conference standings in 2012–13 but advanced to Round 2 of the playoffs after a 4–1 series win over the Guelph Storm. The London Knights skated to a 4–1 series win of their own to end the Rangers' postseason. Ben Fanelli was named as both the winner of the Dan Snyder Memorial Award as the OHL's Humanitarian of the Year, and the CHL Humanitarian of the Year.

The team took a step back in 2013–14, falling to ninth place in the conference standings (22-41-2-3 = 49 points) and missing the playoffs for the first time since 2008–09. The finish led to the Rangers selecting second overall in the upcoming 2014 OHL Priority Selection where they chose left winger Adam Mascherin.

In 2014–15, the team saw a 25-point increase from the season prior, finishing 6th in the western conference with a record of 32-26-3-7 (74 points). They returned to the playoffs, but fell to the London Knights, 4–2, in the opening round.

The team improved by another 21 points the following season, finishing with a record of 44-17-5-2 (95 points) under the tutelage of new head coach Mike Van Ryn in 2015–16. Forwards Ryan MacInnis and Adam Mascherin led the team in points with 81, and Jeremy Bracco had the second-longest point streak in Rangers' franchise history from October 7 - December 9 (26 games), tallying 17 goals and 34 assists for 51 points in that span. The team advanced to the second round of the playoffs for the first time since 2012–13 with a 4–1 series win vs. the Windsor Spitfires before falling in four straight games to the London Knights in Round 2.

After one season behind the Rangers bench, head coach Mike Van Ryn left the team, and associate coach Jay McKee was named the team's new skipper in 2016–17. Adam Mascherin reached the 100-point milestone (35G, 63A) to lead the team in scoring. Down 2–1 in their opening round playoff series vs. the Owen Sound Attack, Rangers goaltender Luke Opilka made 64 saves on 70 shots in Game 4. Owen Sound outshot Kitchener 30–5 in the first period of play, 12–10 in the second, and 29–5 in the third for a game total of 71–20. The Attack would take the best-of-seven series in five games to eliminate the Rangers from the playoffs.

Prior to the 2017–18 season the team acquired defenceman, Memorial Cup champion and Waterloo native, Logan Stanley, from the Windsor Spitfires. Over the course of the season they also added players including Kole Sherwood, Givani Smith, Austin McEneny, Logan Brown and Mario. In the regular season, the team claimed its first Midwest Division championship (43-21-3-1, 90 points) in ten years. They claimed victories in both Round 1 (4-2 vs. Guelph) and Round 2 (4-2 vs. Sarnia) before meeting the CHL's top ranked Sault Ste. Marie Greyhounds in the Western Conference Final. 

After a literal last-second goal gave the Greyhounds a 3–2 win in the Soo in Game 1, the 'Hounds went up 2–0 in the series following a 4–2, Game 2 win. When the series shifted back to Kitchener, Mario Culina backstopped the team to a 24-save, 3–0 shutout in Game 3, and a seven-goal offensive onslaught - powered by a four-point game by Joseph Garreffa - propelled the Rangers to a 7–4 win and tied the series, 2-2. The Rangers fell, 7–3, in Game 5 and played Game 6 back at The Aud two days later. The Rangers led, 3–2, late in the third period but the Greyhounds tied the game with a power play goal with just 1:25 to play, sending the game to overtime. Kole Sherwood extended the Rangers playoff hopes, and the series, by scoring the game-winning goal at 13:12 to force a deciding Game 7. In the clinching game, the teams exchanged goals throughout the night, the Rangers erasing 1-0 and 2-1 leads. With the Greyhounds leading 3–2 in the final minutes of regulation, Logan Stanley blasted a shot from the point that beat goaltender Matthew Villalta and tied the game, 3-3, with just 51 seconds remaining and sent the game to overtime. After a scoreless first overtime period, the game was finally decided in double OT when a Jack Kopacka shot deflected past Culina to win the series for the Greyhounds, affording them a berth into the Ontario Hockey League Final.

Championships
The Kitchener Rangers have appeared in the Memorial Cup six times, winning twice. They have won the J. Ross Robertson Cup four times, are seven-time Hamilton Spectator Trophy winners, and have won eight division titles.

Coaches
There have been 23 coaches in the history of the Kitchener Rangers franchise.

1963–64 Steve Brklacich
1964–65 Floyd "Butch" Martin
1965–66 Wally Kullman
1966–67 Wally Kullman
1967–68 Wally Kullman
1968–69 Wally Kullman
1969–70 Gerry Forler
1970–71 Gerry Forler > Ron Murphy
1971–72 Ron Murphy
1972–73 Eddie Bush
1973–74 Eddie Bush
1974–75 Eddie Bush > Don McKee > Jim Morrison
1975–76 Mac MacLean
1976–77 Mac MacLean
1977–78 Mac MacLean > Bob Ertel
1978–79 Bob Ertel
1979–80 Bob Ertel > Rod Seiling
1980–81 Orval Tessier
1981–82 Joe Crozier
1982–83 Joe Crozier
1983–84 Tom Barrett*
1984–85 Tom Barrett
1985–86 Tom Barrett
1986–87 Tom Barrett > Joe McDonnell
1987–88 Joe McDonnell
1988–89 Joe McDonnell*^
1989–90 Joe McDonnell
1990–91 Joe McDonnell
1991–92 Joe McDonnell
1992–93 Joe McDonnell
1993–94 Joe McDonnell
1994–95 Joe McDonnell > Geoff Ward
1995–96 Geoff Ward
1996–97 Geoff Ward
1997–98 Geoff Ward
1998–99 Brian Hayton
1999–00 Brian Hayton > Jeff Snyder
2000–01 Jeff Snyder
2001–02 Peter DeBoer
2002–03 Peter DeBoer
2003–04 Peter DeBoer
2004–05 Peter DeBoer
2005–06 Peter DeBoer
2006–07 Peter DeBoer
2007–08 Peter DeBoer
2008–09 Steve Spott
2009–10 Steve Spott
2010–11 Steve Spott
2011–12 Steve Spott
2012–13 Steve Spott
2013–14 Troy Smith
2014–15 Troy Smith
2015–16 Mike Van Ryn
2016–17 Jay McKee
2017–18 Jay McKee
2018–19 Jay McKee
2019–20 Jay McKee > Mike McKenzie
2021–22 Mike McKenzie
2022–23 Chris Dennis > Mike McKenzie
*OHL Coach of the Year (Matt Leyden Trophy)

^CHL Coach of the Year

Players

Honoured numbers
The Rangers do not retire numbers (except for the no. 1 which is dedicated to the fans) but choose to honour numbers instead; hanging banners from the rafters while still having them in use for present players. Honoured numbers include five Rangers alumni who were later elected into the Hockey Hall of Fame:

# 3 Scott Stevens
# 4 Al MacInnis
# 6 Paul Coffey
# 7 Bill Barber
# 19 Larry Robinson

Two other numbers are also raised to the rafters of the Kitchener Memorial Auditorium, honouring two former Rangers who lost their lives at a young age:

# 21 Gary Crosby

Gary Crosby was a member of the Rangers for two seasons from 1968 to 1970. The centre was tragically killed in the early morning hours of July 29, 1972 in a head-on collision on Highway 7, eleven kilometers west of Stratford. Crosby was 20 years old.

# 22 Jim McGeachie

Jim McGeachie was a member of the Rangers for two seasons from 1978 to 1980. The left winger was tragically killed in May, 1980 after his red Ford Pinto was hit by an oncoming vehicle along Highway 9 near Teviotdale while he was a member of the Rangers. McGeachie was 19 years old.

NHL/WHA alumni
The Rangers have 186 alumni who have played in the National Hockey League or World Hockey Association. Five alumni have been elected into the Hockey Hall of Fame: Bill Barber, Paul Coffey, Al MacInnis, Larry Robinson and Scott Stevens.

Russ Adam
Chris Ahrens
Jason Akeson
Claire Alexander
John Baby
Justin Bailey
Reid Bailey
Peter Bakovic
Terry Ball
Bill Barber
Brian Bellows
Andre Benoit
Bob Blanchet
Mikkel Boedker
Dennis Bonvie
Robert Bortuzzo
Rick Bourbonnais
Logan Brown
David Bruce
Garrett Burnett
Shawn Burr
Brian Bye
Jerry Byers
Gregory Campbell
Tom Cassidy
Rick Chartraw
David Clarkson
Paul Coffey
Bob Cook
Frank Corrado
Lou Crawford
Andrew Crescenzi
Dave Cressman
Jerry D'Amigo
Patrick Davis
Peter DeBoer
Ab DeMarco
Boyd Devereaux
Gilbert Dionne
Pete Donnelly
Jamie Doornbosch
Rob Dopson
Steve Downie
Mike Duco
Denis Dupere
Mike Eagles
Tim Ecclestone
Don Edwards
Jack Egers
Steve Eminger
Paul Evans
Trevor Fahey
Radek Faksa
Sandy Fitzpatrick
Joe Fortunato
Dwight Foster
Mark Fraser
Jody Gage
John Gibson
Gaston Gingras
Brian Glenwright
David Haas
Matt Halischuk
Kevin Henderson
Paul Higgins
Dan Hinton
Mike Hoffman
Paul Hoganson
Ralph Hopiavouri
Mike Hough
Dale Hunter
Larry Huras
Bob Hurlburt
Lee Inglis
Robbie Irons
Bob Jones
Jim Jones
Nazem Kadri
Petr Kanko
Gord Kannegiesser
Sheldon Kannegiesser
Jakub Kindl
Jim Krulicki
Gary Kurt
Nick Kypreos
Gabriel Landeskog
Jeff Larmer
Matt Lashoff
David Latta
Don "Red" Laurence
Ray LeBlanc
Randy Legge
Hank Lehvonen
Josh Leivo
Chris LiPuma
Don Luce
Chuck Luksa
Brett MacDonald
Al MacInnis 
Dave Maloney 
Don Maloney
Eric Manlow
Grant Martin
Brandon Mashinter
Steve Mason
Brad Maxwell
Dennis McCord
Darwin McCutcheon
Joe McDonnell
Evan McEneny
Dave McLlwain
Sean McMorrow
Julian Melchiori
Chris Meloff
Max Middendorf
Tom Miller
Mike Moher
John Moore
Jason Morgan
Jeremy Morin
Ryan Murphy
Jim Nahrgang
Cam Newton
Claude Noel
Joe Noris
Gerry O'Flaherty
Victor Oreskovich
Billy Orr
Bob Parent
Jim Pavese
Serge Payer
Kent Paynter
Andrew Peters
Walt Poddubny
Paul Pooley
Wayne Presley
Shane Prince
Matt Puempel
Tyler Randell
Jake Rathwell
Paul Reinhart
Steven Rice
Mike Richards
Glen Richardson
Tobias Rieder
Doug Risebrough
Larry Robinson
Mike Robitaille
Allan Rourke
Derek Roy
Darren Rumble
Warren Rychel
Gary Sabourin
Jim Sandlak
Ted Scharf
Ron Sedlbauer
Dan Seguin
Sean Shanahan
David Shaw
Doug Shedden
Jeff Skinner
Nick Spaling
Steve Spott
Mike Stevens
Scott Stevens
Shayne Stevenson
Bill Stewart
Peter Sturgeon
Doug Sulliman
Orval Tessier
Ben Thomson
Scott Timmins
Walt Tkaczuk
Kirk Tomlinson
Mike Torchia
John Tucker
Boris Valabik
Phil Varone
Todd Warriner
Yannick Weber
Rob Whistle
Tony White
Bob Whitlock
Brian Wilks
Craig Wolanin
Bennett Wolf
Jason York
Arber Xhekaj
Wendell Young

Captains 

1963–64 Sandy Fitzpatrick
1964–65 Sandy Fitzpatrick
1965–66 John Beechey, Bob Jones, Billy Hway
1966–67 Walter Tkaczuk
1967–68 Walter Tkaczuk
1968–69 Cam Crosby
1969–70 Dave Cressman
1970–71 Ted Scharf
1971–72 Bill Barber
1972–73 Les Burgess
1973–74 Paul Evans
1974–75 Larry Huras, Dan Djakolovic, Dwight Foster
1975–76 Dwight Foster
1976–77 Dwight Foster
1977–78 Don Maloney
1978–79 Paul Reinhart
1979–80 Jim Pavese
1980–81 Joe McDonnell, Brian Bellows
1981–82 Brian Bellows
1982–83 Mike Eagles
1983–84 Jim Quinn
1984–85 Garnet McKechny, Kent Paynter
1985–86 Shawn Burr
1986–87 Dave Latta
1987–88 Kevin Grant
1988–89 Mike Montanari
1989–90 Steven Rice
1990–91 Steven Rice
1991–92 Mike Polano
1992–93 Mike Polano
1993–94 Tim Spitzig
1994–95 Trevor Gallant, Eric Manlow, Tim Spitzig
1995–96 Brian Scott, Ryan Pepperall
1996–97 Ryan Pepperall
1997–98 Jason Byrnes
1998–99 Darren Mortier
1999–2000 Ryan Milanovic, Serge Payer
2000–01 Chris Cava
2001–02 Nick Policelli
2002–03 Derek Roy
2003–04 Mike Richards
2004–05 Mike Richards
2005–06 Mark Fraser
2006–07 Jean-Michel Rizk, Peter Tsimikalis
2007–08 Matt Pepe
2008–09 Ben Shutron, Dan Kelly
2009–10 Dan Kelly
2010–11 Gabriel Landeskog
2011–12 Michael Catenacci
2012–13 Ryan Murphy
2013–14 Ben Fanelli
2014–15 Liam Maaskant
2015–16 Ryan MacInnis
2016–17 Frank Hora
2017–18 Connor Bunnaman
2018–19 Rickard Hugg
2019–20 Riley Damiani, Greg Meireles
2021–22 Francesco Pinelli
2022–23 Francesco Pinelli

Award recipients

Ontario Hockey League awards
Members of the Kitchener Rangers have been named recipients of OHL Awards 34 times.

OHL All-Star Team 
Members of the Kitchener Rangers have been named to All-Star teams 61 times.

OHL All-Rookie Team 
Members of the Kitchener Rangers have been named to All-Star teams 23 times.

Arena 

The Kitchener Rangers play home games at the Kitchener Memorial Auditorium Complex. The Auditorium was built in 1951 and underwent major renovations in 2002.  In 2007–08, over 500 seats were added to accommodate larger crowds for the 2008 Memorial Cup. Over the 2012 off-season, The Aud was once again expanded with the addition of close to 1,000 seats, as well as an upper concourse and improvements to team dressing rooms and business offices. The Kitchener Memorial Auditorium Complex includes Jack Couch Park for baseball, Kiwanis and Kinsmen ice pads in the arena, and the main Auditorium arena known as the Dom Cardillo Arena. Centennial Stadium (football) was demolished in Spring, 2013 due to safety concerns.

 Capacity = 7,068 seats + 632 standing room = total capacity of 7,700
 Ice size = 192' x 85'

The Auditorium hosted the Memorial Cup tournament in 1962, 1975, 1984 and 2008. The OHL All-Star Game was played there in 1980 & 1985 as well as the CHL Top Prospects Game in 2003 and in 2021.

Season results

Legend: GP = Games played, W = Wins, L = Losses, T = Ties, OTL = Overtime losses, SL = Shoot-out losses, Pts = Points, GF = Goals for, GA = Goals against

Notes

References

External links
 Official website of the Kitchener Rangers
 Official website of the Ontario Hockey League
 Official website of the Canadian Hockey League

Sport in Kitchener, Ontario
Ontario Hockey League teams
Ice hockey clubs established in 1963
Publicly traded sports companies
1963 establishments in Ontario